
Gmina Grodzisk Mazowiecki is an urban-rural gmina (administrative district) in Grodzisk Mazowiecki County, Masovian Voivodeship, in east-central Poland.

Villages
Apart from the town of Grodzisk Mazowiecki, Gmina Grodzisk Mazowiecki contains the villages and settlements of Adamów, Adamowizna, Chlebnia, Chrzanów Duży, Chrzanów Mały, Czarny Las, Izdebno Kościelne, Janinów, Kady, Kałęczyn, Kozerki, Kozery, Kraśnicza Wola, Książenice, Makówka, Marynin, Mościska, Natolin, Nowe Izdebno, Nowe Kłudno, Nowe Kozery, Odrano-Wola, Opypy, Radonie, Stare Kłudno, Szczęsne, Tłuste, Urszulin, Wężyk, Władków, Wólka Grodziska, Zabłotnia and Żuków.

Neighbouring gminas
Gmina Grodzisk Mazowiecki is bordered by the town of Milanówek and by the gminas of Baranów, Błonie, Brwinów, Jaktorów, Nadarzyn, Radziejowice and Żabia Wola.

References
Polish official population figures 2006

Grodzisk Mazowiecki
Grodzisk Mazowiecki County